The Gewässerkennzahl (GKZ, rarely GWK or GEWKZ) or "waterbody index number/waterbody number" is an identifier with which all watercourses in Germany are numbered, together with their catchments and precipitation areas. It is also referred to as a Gebietskennzahl or "basin number". A Gewässerkennzahl may have up to 13 figures (theoretically even 19). Basins normally are only defined up to seven figures. For a more detailed subdivision, the Gewässerkennzahl may be enlarged by ten more figures. Only that enlarged version is called Fließgewässerkennziffer. The Gewässerkennzahlen are defined by the environment offices of the states.

History 
In order to have comparable values and usable data across the state of Germany, the Federal and State Water Authorities agreed in December 1970 to create a unified system for hydrological work on certain important rivers and their above-ground catchment areas and to issue them with index numbers. Linked to that was the establishment of the size and boundaries of their catchment areas.

Principle 
Every waterbody (streams, rivers, canals and ditches, but also lakes and even some bays) and its catchment area was given a waterbody number in such a way that it could be clearly identified. The waterbody numbers are built in hierarchical fashion so that, based on the number, the next river system of the waterbody can be deduced.

Scheme 
At first the course of water has to be defined from source to mouth. Then the four major tributaries (or 'affluents') are identified. They are marked by even figures in downstream sequence, "-2, -4, -6, -8". This way, the (main) course is divided into five sections, which are marked by odd figures, "-1, -3, -5, -7, -9".  A number with an even end-digit is the number of a whole watercourse, while a number with an odd end-digit is the number of a section. Lowest sections are always given a nine, even if not all figures between one and nine have been used. In the next step of numbering, each section defined by the first step is dealt in the same way, selecting four major tributaries and marking five sections.

Lakes 
Lakes are integrated as a part of the watercourse formed by their main tributary and their outlet.

Coastal regions 
For coastal regions, the scheme of numbering was altered in different ways by different states:
 Lower Saxony left the rule of using only odd numbers for sections. Nevertheless, bay as dependent waterbodies got even numbers.
 Mecklenburg-Vorpommern stuck to using even numbers for important rivers and odd numbers for – here coastal – sections in between. But the course of the coast was defined in a way, that in two straits different third figures were used for their two banks.

Waterbodies without a Gewässerkennzahl 
Some waterbodies indexed under this classification system have un-indexed headstreams or lateral tributaries in the form of very small streams or ditches. If such an unclassified waterbody is relevant for the water management of the region, it may be given a number within the local classification system of the regional Wasser- und Bodenverband (association for water and ground management).

Catchment areas 
The numbers for a watercourse and its catchment area are thus identical. If a river has subsidiary watercourses, an additional figure is allocated to its index number for each further branch. So in theory even a rivulet could be allocated its own catchment. In practice, catchment numbering for water sources below the level of streams is not used.

Catchment areas are thus distinguished by a number with up to a maximum of seven digits. Watercourse index numbers, by contrast, may have up to 13 digits in order to be able to classify all their tributaries and headstreams; although in practice only 10 digits are used.

Main river systems 
The first digit of the number indicates which major river basin the waterbody belongs to, as follows:
 1 Danube
 2 Rhine
 3 Ems
 4 Weser
 5 Elbe
 6 Oder
 9 Coastal region

The second and subsequent digits of the index number represent further subdivisions of the river and its catchment area.

Example 
The Heusiepen stream in Remscheid has waterbody number 27366462. This can be decoded as follows:

 Main stem system / catchment area Rhine (2)
 → River system / catchment area Wupper (2-736)
 → River system / catchment area Morsbach (2-736-6)
 → River system / catchment area Gelpe (2-736-6-4)
 → River system / catchment area Saalbach (2-736-6-4-6)
 → Stream without defined catchment area Heusiepen (2-736-6-4-6-2)

Waterbody index numbers 
Listed below are all the rivers with up to a three-figure index number, and some rivers with four-figure numbers above a length of 50 km.

1 Danube

2 Rhine

3 Ems 
Here some three-figure numbers are not listed.

4 Weser

5 Elbe

6 Oder

9 Coastal region

Literature 
 Landesamt für Wasser und Abfall Nordrhein-Westfalen (publ.): Gebietsbezeichnung und Verzeichnis der Gewässer in Nordrhein-Westfalen

See also 
 Waterbody index number – an overview
 Stream order, hydrological hierarchy of rivers and streams

References

External links 
 Bund-Länder Arbeitsgemeinschaft Wasser (LAWA)
 Erläuterung der Gewässerkennzahl im Bayerischen Landesamt für Umwelt

Identifiers
Bodies of water of Germany
Water resources management
Limnology
Hydrology